Bo Rangers Football Club commonly known as Bo Rangers is a Sierra Leonean professional football club based in the country's second largest city of Bo. They are currently a member of the Sierra Leone National Premier League, the highest division of  football league in Sierra Leone. Bo Rangers have an intense rivalry with city rivals Nepean Stars. The club supporters are primarily from Bo District.

Coaches
 Mohammed Regers
 Vandy Massaquoi
 Solomon Williams
 Stephen Morseray

References

Football clubs in Sierra Leone
Bo, Sierra Leone
1966 establishments in Sierra Leone